John Chapman is an Australian former rugby League footballer who played in the 1970s and 1980s. He was a premiership winner in Sydney's 1977 NSWRFL season.

Career
Originally from Blayney, New South Wales, Chapman represented N.S.W. Country as an 18-year-old in 1972 before moving to the St George Dragons in 1973. He played six seasons for St George between 1973-1978 which included three grand final appearances. He played on the wing in the losing 1975 Grand Final team.

Chapman won a premiership with the Dragons in 1977. He played on the wing in the 1977 Grand Final Draw against Parramatta and missed a penalty kick for goal in the dying seconds of extra time, sending the drawn match to a replay. The following Wednesday in the 1977 Grand Final Replay the Dragons beat Parramatta 22-0 and Chapman became at premiership winner. 

He left St. George and joined Parramatta for two seasons in 1979-1980, before finishing career at the Brisbane club, Redcliffe.

References

1955 births
Living people
Australian rugby league players
New South Wales rugby league team players
Country New South Wales rugby league team players
Parramatta Eels players
Rugby league wingers
Date of birth missing (living people)
Rugby league players from New South Wales
St. George Dragons players